"Little Big Girl" is the twelfth episode of the eighteenth season of the American animated television series The Simpsons. It originally aired on the Fox network in the United States on February 11, 2007. It was written by Don Payne, and directed by Raymond S. Persi. Natalie Portman guest starred as a new character, Darcy. The title is a play on the Dustin Hoffman movie Little Big Man.  The last time the title was parodied was in season 11's "Little Big Mom."

Plot
At his farm, Cletus is milking his cow when he accidentally kicks over a lantern, prompting a series of Rube Goldberg-esque events that leads to a chicken starting a fire. Cletus's cow succeeds in extinguishing the fire, but Cletus drops his smoking pipe, leading to a wildfire around Springfield. The townspeople try to extinguish it, to no avail. At Springfield Elementary, Principal Skinner asks Groundskeeper Willie to get the fire extinguisher, but all of them have been stolen by Bart to propel his wagon. As Bart rockets around town, the foam released from the extinguishers puts out the wildfire. Bart is cheered as a hero by everyone and rewarded with a driver's license by Mayor Quimby.

Bart starts using Homer's car for his own pleasure, but is eventually tabbed for family errands, mostly chauffeuring Homer. After many inappropriate requests, Bart flees to North Haverbrook, where he meets a 15-year-old girl named Darcy, who believes Bart is much older. They begin a romantic relationship and Darcy soon proposes marriage. At the court house, Bart reveals his age, whereupon Darcy reveals that she is pregnant, much to Bart's depression. Darcy admits that Bart is not the father as they have not consummated the relationship - the real father is a Norwegian exchange student, and she wants to get married because her parents would be upset about her premarital pregnancy. Bart agrees to marry Darcy, and they drive to Utah, where marriage restrictions are looser and they can start a new life together.

Eventually, Homer, Marge and Darcy's parents catch up with them to stop the wedding, where Darcy's father tries to reason with Bart as he believes that Bart took advantage of a girl much older than him and got her pregnant. Darcy confesses to her parents that Bart is not the father, and that she did not want her parents to be disappointed by her pregnancy. Darcy's mother, thrilled, confesses that she is pregnant too, and the family agrees to pass the two babies off as twins. Darcy and Bart end their relationship, while Bart assures her they will meet again, to which she agrees. Later, Bart admits to Homer that he looked forward to being a father, and Homer cheers him up by going with him on a ride around town at night.

When Lisa struggles to find excitement and intrigue in her family heritage for a school presentation, she decides to take creative license. Inspired by Bart's "Indian butter trick" and the well-known kitchen curtains, with their stalks-of-corn pattern, Lisa claims to be Native American, from the "Hitachi" tribe, a name Lisa selects based on the Hitachi brand of the family's microwave oven. The embellishment turns into a web of lies when Lisa is chosen to represent the school and her "people" at City Hall, then as a keynote speaker for the National Native American Tribal Council. She eventually admits she lied about her heritage, but is spared from prosecution when the other speakers admit they are not true Native Americans. Homer compares his daughter to CBS News in a reference to the 2004 Killian documents controversy. As they leave, Homer mentions that his great-great-grandmother actually was a Native American, much to Lisa's chagrin.

Trivia
The town of North Haverbrook was last mentioned in the season 4 episode "Marge vs. the Monorail" as one of the towns that was scammed and left a ghost town by Lyle Langley, although in this episode it appears the town has now recovered.

Reception 
Robert Canning of IGN gave the episode a 7.2/10 "Good" rating, stating “the episode was enjoyable and featured a decent guest voice appearance from Natalie Portman. It was a half hour that felt more like a classic Simpsons episode than the series has given us lately, both with story structure and references, which was bound to make any longtime fan happy.”

References

External links 

 

The Simpsons (season 18) episodes
2007 American television episodes
Television episodes about teenage pregnancy